Andre Rindlisbacher (born 22 January 1963) is a Swiss former footballer who played in the 1980s and 1990s He played mainly in the position as midfielder, but also as defender. He is now entrepreneur and business owner.

Football career
Rindlisbacher was first with FC Zürich in the first tier of Swiss football. But because of their existing formation he did not get and domestic league playing time with the team and therefore he moved on to FC Baden for the 1985–86 Nationalliga A season. Here he became part of the regular starting formation. But at the end of the season Rindlisbacher and the team suffered relegation. He moved on to FC Aarau and stayed with then for two seasons.

Rindlisbacher joined FC Basel's first team for their 1988–89 season under head coach Urs Siegenthaler. After playing in seven test games Rindlisbacher played his domestic league debut for his new club in the away game on 23 July 1988 as Basel played a 1–1 draw against Zürich. Rindlisbacher scored his first goal for his club on 13 May 1989 in the home game in the St. Jakob Stadium as Basel played a 1–1 draw with CS Chênois.

He stayed with club for two seasons and during this time Rindlisbacher played a total of 90 games for Basel scoring a total of three goals. 58 of these games were in the Nationalliga B, 10 in the Swiss Cup and 22 were friendly games. He scored one goal in the domestic league, one in the cup and the other was scored during the test games.

Rindlisbacher then moved on to play for AC Bellinzona, also in the second tier of Swiss football. A few years later he ended his active playing career with FC Frauenfeld playing with them for six seasons as team captain and midfield playmaker. During this time, in the 1994–95 season, Rindlisbacher also played with player-coach Joachim Löw in his first position as team manager.

Private life 
Andre Rindlisbacher has a twin brother. They are entrepreneurs and business owners. They founded the Freestar-Informatik AG in 1998 with the idea that in addition to the existing IT business project, a professional, free and creative work environment should be created for IT specialists. The business has continually been expanded. Today there are five Freestar companies.

Andre Rindlisbacher was member of FC Frauenfeld's board of directors and presided over the club for the period from 1998 to 2003.

References

Sources
 Die ersten 125 Jahre. Publisher: Josef Zindel im Friedrich Reinhardt Verlag, Basel. 
 Verein "Basler Fussballarchiv" Homepage

External links
 The Freestar Group online

FC Zürich players
FC Baden players
FC Aarau players
FC Basel players
AC Bellinzona players
Swiss men's footballers
Association football defenders
Association football midfielders
1963 births
Living people
Swiss sports executives and administrators
Footballers from Zürich